St. John's Episcopal Church is a national historic district that consists of an Episcopal church complex located at Mount Morris in Livingston County, New York. The complex consists of the 1857 Gothic Revival brick church and an 1867 frame parsonage.  The parsonage is constructed in the Carpenter Gothic style.

It was listed on the National Register of Historic Places in 1991.

References

Episcopal church buildings in New York (state)
Churches on the National Register of Historic Places in New York (state)
Historic districts on the National Register of Historic Places in New York (state)
Gothic Revival church buildings in New York (state)
Churches completed in 1857
19th-century Episcopal church buildings
Churches in Livingston County, New York
National Register of Historic Places in Livingston County, New York
1857 establishments in New York (state)